Javier Naranjo Villegas (21 January 1919 – 7 March 2014) was a Colombian Prelate of Roman Catholic Church.

Villegas was born in  Abejorral, Colombia and was ordained a priest on March 15, 1942. Villegas was appointed bishop of the Diocese of Santa Marta on June 2, 1971 and consecrated on June 29, 1971. Villegas remained at the Diocese of Santa Marta until his resignation on July 24, 1980.

External links and additional sources
 (for Chronology of Bishops)
 (for Chronology of Bishops)

20th-century Roman Catholic bishops in Colombia
1919 births
2014 deaths
Roman Catholic bishops of Santa Marta